Faculty of Pharmacy of Monastir  is affiliated to University of Monastir, located in the street Ibn Sina in Monastir in Tunisia. It was founded by Act No. 75/72 of 14 November 1975.

It is the only institution for the study of pharmacy in Tunisia. It delivers the diplomas of doctor of pharmacy and of pharmacists specialists in biology and hospital and industrial pharmacists. It provides doctoral training in the framework of master and doctoral thesis. The studies are organized according to a first cycle of two years, a second cycle of four years, including a year of internship, and a thesis to obtain the national diploma of doctor of pharmacy.

The faculty of Pharmacy shares the same campus with the faculty of dental medicine.

On 20 November 2015, the faculty celebrates its fortieth anniversary.

Deanship 
In 2012, Professor Souad Sfar is the dean of the faculty and Professor Fethi Safta its vice-dean. In 2015, they were replaced by Professors Abdelhalim Trabelsi and Mohsen Hassine respectively.

See also 
 Monastir
 University of Monastir
 Faculty of Dental Medicine of Monastir
 Faculty of Medicine of Monastir

References

External links 

Educational institutions established in 1975